In Greek mythology, Electra or Elektra (Ēlektra, "amber") was the name of the following women:

 Electra (Oceanid), one of the Oceanids who was the wife of Thaumas and mother of Iris and the Harpies.
 Electra (Pleiad), one of the Pleiades.
 Electra, one of the Danaids, daughter of Danaus, king of Libya and the naiad Polyxo. She married and later killed her husband Peristhenes or Hyperantus following the commands of her father.
 Electra, daughter of Agamemnon and Clytemnestra.
Electra, handmaiden of Helen who fastened her mistress' sandals when she went to the walls of Troy.
Electra, sister of Cadmus, of whom he named after the Electran gate at Thebes. She might be instead the mother of Cadmus because later writers noted that the other name for his mother Telephassa was Electra.

Notes

References 

 Hesiod, Theogony from The Homeric Hymns and Homerica with an English Translation by Hugh G. Evelyn-White, Cambridge, MA.,Harvard University Press; London, William Heinemann Ltd. 1914. Online version at the Perseus Digital Library. Greek text available from the same website.
 Gaius Julius Hyginus, Fabulae from The Myths of Hyginus translated and edited by Mary Grant. University of Kansas Publications in Humanistic Studies. Online version at the Topos Text Project.
 Pausanias, Description of Greece with an English Translation by W.H.S. Jones, Litt.D., and H.A. Ormerod, M.A., in 4 Volumes. Cambridge, MA, Harvard University Press; London, William Heinemann Ltd. 1918. Online version at the Perseus Digital Library
 Pausanias, Graeciae Descriptio. 3 vols. Leipzig, Teubner. 1903.  Greek text available at the Perseus Digital Library.
 Pseudo-Apollodorus, The Library with an English Translation by Sir James George Frazer, F.B.A., F.R.S. in 2 Volumes, Cambridge, MA, Harvard University Press; London, William Heinemann Ltd. 1921. Online version at the Perseus Digital Library. Greek text available from the same website.

Princesses in Greek mythology
Danaids